Jane Salvage FRCN (born 6 August 1953) is a British nursing policy activist, teacher, and writer who was named a Fellow of the Faculty of Nursing and Midwifery of the Royal College of Surgeons in Ireland in 2019. Salvage has been described as "a hugely influential nurse leader who has contributed to advancing nursing in a wide number of roles throughout her career".

Salvage began training in a nurse in 1974, and became a writer after publishing an article with Nursing Mirror in 1978. She was involved with numerous nursing-related trade magazines, and later established a career in global health, leading World Health Organization (WHO) programmes in nursing and midwifery. Throughout her career, Salvage has brought attention to the politics of health, as well as highlighted issues such as low nurse pay, poor treatment of nurses, working conditions, and nursing's lack of status. Through her work with the organization Nursing Now, 2020 was declared the International Year of the Nurse and Midwife.

Early life and education
Jane Salvage was born in Brighton, Sussex, England, on 6 August 1953. Her parents, Patricia Walker and Robert Salvage, separated shortly after the birth of her brother in 1957. Following their separation, Salvage was raised by her mother and grandparents. After attending the Brighton and Hove School for Girls, Salvage studied English, French, and Italian Literature at Newnham College, part of the University of Cambridge. She was the first student to serve on Newnham College's governing body, and later became a Newnham Honorary Associate. 

Following the death of her brother in 1974, Salvage trained at the Princess Alexandra School of Nursing, part of the Royal London Hospital. She then qualified as a registered nurse and began working as a staff nurse.

Career
Salvage began working as a staff nurse on the East End of London in the late 1970s. She first became involved in activism in 1978, when funding cuts to the National Health Service (NHS) threatened to close Bethnal Green Hospital. In the late 1970s, Salvage was also active in the Anti-Nazi League and Rock Against Racism.

Writing
After her 1978 article in Nursing Mirror magazine about cuts to the National Health Service and the poor treatment of nurses, Salvage was invited to write a monthly "Student's View" column for the magazine. After graduating, Salvage joined the staff of Nursing Mirror full time and won an outstanding trainee of the year award during the International Publishing Corporation Business Press proficiency examination. Later in 1981, Salvage began working at rival magazine Nursing Times as a news and features editor. In 1984, she became the launch editor of Senior Nurse (1984 – 1987), then became a special projects editor on Nursing Standard. 

While working on these magazines, Salvage highlighted issues related to nurses' low pay, poor working conditions, and lack of status; meanwhile, she raised awareness of the politics of health. These issues reflect the views of the Radical Nurses Group, of which she was an active member. In the 1980s, Salvage's writing focused on feminist views of nursing and highlighted the need for intersectionality in healthcare. In 1988, A. Cole described Salvage as "the radical voice of nursing", citing her 1985 textbook The Politics of Nursing.  

The success of The Politics of Nursing reflected nurses' growing recognition of the need to be more assertive. Neil Kinnock hailed the book as an early attempt to bring the ideas of the modern women's movement to the nursing field. In 1988, Salvage attained a MSc in sociology with special reference to medicine from Royal Holloway and Bedford New College, University of London, writing a dissertation on the movement known as 'the New Nursing', which promoted patient-centered care through modernization of the profession. 

Salvage's next book, Nurses at Risk, was co-authored with Rosemary Rogers. It focused on nurses' health and safety at work, and was described as 'a courageous ground-breaker' in her citation for an honorary doctorate from the University of Sheffield in 1996. In 1997, while serving as editor-in-chief of Nursing Times, she was named the British Society of Magazine Editors runner-up Editor of the Year. In 1999, she was named the Periodical Publishers Association Columnist of the Year. In 1998, she was a speaker in the 50th Anniversary Lecture Series marking the foundation of the NHS. 

Between 2010 and 2012, Salvage edited NMC Review for the UK Nursing and Midwifery Council. From 2013 to 2021, she was Writer in Residence and Visiting Professor at Kingston University and St George's, University of London.

Salvage wrote an obituary on Muriel Skeet, who also fought for the 'advancement of nursing,' which was published in the Guardian.’

Health and nursing leadership
From 1988 to 1991, Salvage served as director of the Nursing Developments Programme at the King's Fund. The programme identified and supported Nursing Development Units in hospitals and community services, promoting research-based, patient-centred care and advocating for greater nursing autonomy. 

After her tenure at the King's Fund, Salvage worked as Regional Adviser for Nursing and Midwifery at the WHO's European regional office in Copenhagen. During her tenure, she helped to improve nursing and midwifery in central and eastern Europe. Her team also produced the first evidence-based comparative study of nursing and midwifery in Europe. In 2004, she served as interim chief scientist for nursing at the WHO headquarters in Geneva. While serving as interim chief scientist, she worked to re-establish nursing systems in countries affected by armed conflict, such as in former Yugoslavia and Iraq. From 2003 to 2008, Salvage worked with the British charity Medact, where she co-authored and edited three reports on the health and environmental costs of the Iraq War and the damages to its health system. 

Between 2009 and 2010, Salvage was involved with the secretariat of the Prime Minister's Commission on the Future of Nursing and Midwifery. The commission was launched by Prime Minister Gordon Brown and chaired by Anne Keen. She also was a co-leader with the secretariat of the Willis Commission on Nursing Education, chaired by Phil Willis. Its 2012 report, Quality with Compassion: the future of nursing education, found that moving to an all-graduate nursing profession was essential.

As policy advisor to the UK All-Party Parliamentary Group on Global Health, Salvage worked closely with its chair Nigel Crisp on a review of global nursing, called Triple Impact. The review urged policy makers worldwide to see nursing in a different light, and offered solutions and development opportunities. Triple Impact served as a springboard for the global Nursing Now campaign, whose actions led to the declaration of 2020 as the International Year of the Nurse and Midwife. Salvage was involved in the campaign and wrote and spoke about it worldwide. From 2016 to 2021, Salvage served as director of the International Council of Nurses' Global Nursing Leadership Institute, an annual programme helping nurse leaders improve their policies and political competencies. In 2021 Salvage served as director of a pilot midwifery leadership programme commissioned by the Government of India to advance its Midwifery Initiative, which has been implemented by the WHO Country Office for India.

Awards and recognition
In 2008, Nursing Times named her the sixth most influential nurse of the last 60 years. In 2018, as part of the 70th anniversary of the NHS, the NHS identified Salvage as one of the 70 most influential UK nurses and midwives of the past 70 years. In 2012, Salvage was named a Fellow of the Royal College of Nursing. In 2019, Salvage was elected as a Fellow of the Faculty of Nursing and Midwifery of the Royal College of Surgeons in Ireland.

Bibliography
 1985 The Politics of Nursing London: Butterworth-Heinemann; 
 1986 Models for Nursing New York: Wiley
 1988 Nurses at Risk: A Guide to Health and Safety at Work (with Rosemary Rogers) London: Butterworth-Heinemann; 
 1991 Nurse Practitioners: Working for Change London: King's Fund; 
 1993 Nursing in Action: Strengthening Nursing and Midwifery to Support Health for All Copenhagen: World Health Organization
 1997 Nursing in Europe:  A Resource for Better Health Copenhagen: World Health Organization; 
 2011 Skyros: Island of Dreams Skyros: Skyros Foundation;

References 

British nursing administrators
Nursing educators
Nursing in the United Kingdom
Nursing research
Alumni of Newnham College, Cambridge
Living people
1953 births
Fellows of the Royal College of Nursing
British nurses